Joseph Schulum (December 19, 1839 – February 4, 1906) was a Jewish German-American cigar manufacturer and politician.

Life 
Schulum was born on December 19, 1839, in the Kingdom of Hanover. He immigrated to America with his parents when he was young, settling in New York City.

After attending Mrs. Hatfield's School at Ridge and Broome Streets for two years, Schulum began working as a cigar maker. In 1871, he became a cigar manufacturer.

In 1895, Schulum was elected to the New York State Assembly as a Democrat, representing the New York County 12th District. He served in the Assembly in 1896, 1897, and 1898.

Schulum never married, and lived with his sister Fannie. He lived in the Lower East Side, and belonged a number of organizations from that area. He was a member of the Free Sons of Israel and the Freemasons.

Schulum died at home of pneumonia on February 4, 1906. He was buried in Salem Fields Cemetery.

References

External links 

 The Political Graveyard

1839 births
1906 deaths
Hanoverian emigrants to the United States
American people of German-Jewish descent
Politicians from Manhattan
People from the Lower East Side
19th-century American politicians
Democratic Party members of the New York State Assembly
Jewish American state legislators in New York (state)
American Freemasons
Deaths from pneumonia in New York City
Burials at Salem Fields Cemetery